Reder is a German surname. Notable people with the surname include:

 Bernard Reder (1887–1964), artist from Czernowitz, Bukovina
 Johnny Reder (1909–1990), Polish-American sportsman
 Walter Reder (1915–1991), German SS officer

See also
 Reeder (disambiguation)
 Rehder

German-language surnames